Marc Jozef Magareta van den Broek (born 1953 in Antwerp, Belgium) is a Belgian artist and sculptor.

Life 
Marc van den Broek was born on February 2, 1953, in Mortsel-Antwerp. From 1963 to 1965 and from 1970 to 1971 he studied at the Akademie voor Schone Kunsten in Bechem-Antwerp. During the years 1965–70, he attended the Technical School voor Electro-Mechanic in Antwerp, followed by studies at the Institut voor Kunstambachten in Antwerp from 1972 to 1975.
Marc van den Broek is a founding member of the "Hinterhaus" cultural center established in Wiesbaden, Germany in 1978. He co-founded the Art Research Laboratories in 1990.

Art 

In the early 1980s, Marc van den Broek focused largely on spatial installations based on a symbiosis of art and technology: the flying objects known as mutants. In 1984, he began developing works of kinetic art, culminating in the Archaic-Technological-Metamorphosis (A.TE.M.) in 1987–1989. A.TE.M. is the manifest expression of Marc van den Broek's overall intellectual and spiritual concept: The archaic is represented by the basic forms (sphere, cube and pyramid); the technological aspect is the principle underlying the construction of the objects, and metamorphosis is realized in the movements of the objects.

The Declaration of Independence (Die Unabhängigkeitserklärung) was realized between 1990 and 1992 as a kinetic sculpture which marks the end of the era of materialism in the waning years of the industrial age.

Inspired by intensive, long-term cooperation with leading industrial and commercial firms, Marc van den Broek developed the project entitled "The Impact of Art in Business." In this work he takes up Joseph Beuys's concept of "Social Sculpture" and concludes that the symbiosis of art and entrepreneurship is a synergetic process of creation which contributes to the spiritual development of society through innovation and revelation. Marc van den Broek continued to pursue this approach during his years in New York (1998–2008), where he worked with numerous well-known companies.

The artist is also concerned with changing perceptions of reality under the influence of the Internet and the question of how this process can be visualized in art. His work in this area includes a series of large-scale paintings grouped under the heading of Angels and other Ambassadors. In spring 2010 Marc van den Broek launched an art installation referring to Social Sculptures: The Garden of Nomads, a modular ensemble that can be installed in any setting and thus impacts on the urban organism in variety of ways.

Since more than 35 years Marc van den Broek has been working on the artwork and technical illustrations of Leonardo da Vinci. This leads him in 2018 to the publication of his artistic book Leonardo da Vincis Spirits of Inventions, where the sources and origins of da Vincis inventions has been researched and documented. In 2019 the english edition Leonardo da Vinci Spirits of Inventions - A Search for Traces has been published.

Exhibitions 
 1974: Gallery Den Bellaert, Antwerp/Belgium
 1976: Salon International Jeune Peinture, Versailles/France
 1977: Belgian House (Consulat), Cologne/Germany
 1977: International Drawing Biennale, Cleveland/Great Britain
 1977: University Museum, Marburg/Germany
 1977: Gallery Christa Moehring, Wiesbaden/Germany
 1977: Kulturamt Wetzlar, Avemann'sches House, Wetzlar/Germany
 1979: Kunstkamer Manebrugge, Antwerp/Belgium
 1980: Internationale Jugendtriennale und Meister der Zeichnung, Nürnberg/Germany
 1982: University of Arts, Berlin/Germany
 1983: Kunsthalle-Studio, Darmstadt/Germany
 1983: Brückenturm-Gallery, Mainz/Germany
 1984: BMW-Gallery, Munic/Germany
 1984: BMW-Gallery, Berlin/Germany
 1985: Art Gallery Artists from Hesse, Darmstadt/Germany
 1985: AREA, New York/USA
 1985: Hessian Days of Culture in Armenia/USSR-Erevan
 1985: Gallery CA, Düsseldorf/Germany
 1986: Museum, San Sebastian/Spain
 1986: Mathildenhöhe "Symmetrie", Darmstadt/Germany
 1986: Neue Darmstädter Sezession, Darmstadt/Germany
 1987: Town Hall Tempelhof "The Dream of Flying", Berlin/Germany
 1987: Trade Fair "Energy and Environment", Saarbrücken/Germany
 1987: Federal state Hesse "Angels and other Heavenly Beings", Bonn, Bad Soden, Hanover/Germany
 1989: Airport, Frankfurt/Germany
 1992: Museum, Bad Hersfeld/Germany
 1992: Brückenturm-Gallery, Mainz/Germany
 1994: The New Adam, Berlin, Kassel/Germany
 1994: Town Hall at the Dome, Wetzlar/Germany
 1997: IHK Würzburg-Schweinfurt, Würzburg/Germany
 2000: Iron Cast Gallery, New York/USA
 2003: N6 Gallery, Brooklyn, New York/USA
 2006: ZDF Studio Exhibition, Brüssel/Belgien
 2011: Schaalsee Gallery, Dargow/Germany
 2013: A.TE.M. Werkstätten, Hamburg/Germany
 2015: Kulturschiff MS Stubnitz, Museum Ship Cap San Diego, Hamburg/Germany
 2016: A.TE.M. Gallery, Hamburg/Germany
 2019: Kunstarche, Wiesbaden/Germany

Art in public 
 1987: Entrance Hall Louise-Schröder-School, Wiesbaden/Germany
 1988: Design Prehistoric Museum, Dotternhausen/Germany
 1988: Foyer design Telecommunication Centre, Wiesbaden/Germany
 1988: "A.TE.M.", Outdoor area design, training center of Bundesanstalt für Flugsicherung, Langen/Frankfurt a. Main/Germany [1]
 1989: Foyer design, M.C.S. Company, Eltville/Germany
 1990: Foyer design, Ploenzke Company, Wiesbaden/Germany
 1990: "ATEMSTERN", Open air sculpture, Kreditanstalt für Wiederaufbau, Frankfurt a.Main/Germany
 1990: "Implantat", art project for the German Electron Synchrotron (DESY), Hamburg, Frankfurt a. Main/Germany
 1990: Design of the Municipal Conference Room, City Hall of the State Capital, Wiesbaden/Germany
 1993: Foyer design Procedo Company, Wiesbaden/Germany
 1994: Holocaust Memorial, Wiesbaden-Nordenstadt/Germany
 1995: Design Crédit Suisse, Messeturm, Frankfurt/Germany
 1995: Design Flying Object, Airport Zürich/Switzerland

Collections 
Marc van den Broek's work is held in the following collections:
City of Mainz, City of Wiesbaden, City of Wetzlar, Kreditanstalt für Wiederaufbau KfW, Frankfurt, Credit Suisse and Zurich Airport

Awards 
 1994–1995 German Corporate Design Award
 2001 Exhibit Design Award Monsanto
 2001 Exhibit Design Award AVAYA (AT&T)
 2004 Industrial Designer Society of America Excellence Awards-Silver; IDEA for the Botanical Garden Cleveland
 2017 Remi Winner, 50th Worldfest Houston, International Film Festival, Houston/Texas
 2017 Winner, Best Experimental Shortfilm, Short to the Point, Film Festival Bukarest/Rumänien
 2017 Winner, Liverpool Independent Film Festival, Liverpool/UK
 2018 Winner/Gold Award, International Independent Film Awards, Encino, Los Angeles/US

Literature 
 Der Traum vom Fliegen, Rathaus Tempelhof, Berlin/Germany 
 Symmetrie in Kunst, Natur und Wissenschaft, Ausstellungskatalog Mathildenhöhe Darmstadt/Germany, August 1986
 Marc van den Broek: Brush Tracks, 1994–1995, Wiesbaden, author´s edition
 Marc van den Broek: gezeichnet gedacht gelebt, 2013, Hamburg, author´s edition
 Leonardo da Vincis Erfindungsgeister, 2018, Mainz/Germany 
 Leonardo da Vinci Spirits of Invention - A Search for Traces, 2019, Hamburg

External links

References 

Contemporary painters
Belgian painters
1953 births
Living people
20th-century Belgian sculptors